Amalia Bettini (1809–1894) was an Italian stage actress.

She was a leading member of the famous theatre company of Salvatore Fabbrichesi. She was famous for her roles as heroine. For a period, she managed her own theatre company. Between 1831 and 1840, she was a premier actress in the company of Gaetano Nardelli. In 1840–1842, she was a member of the Royal Theatre of Sardinia. She was famous in all Italy for her large repertoire within both comedy and tragedy. She retired after her marriage in 1842.

References 

1809 births
1894 deaths
19th-century Italian actresses
19th-century theatre managers
19th-century businesswomen